Hökarängen metro station is on the green line of Sweden's Stockholm metro, located in Hökarängen, Söderort. The station was inaugurated on 1 October 1950 as part of the inaugural stretch of Stockholm metro between Slussen and Hökarängen. On 18 November 1958 the line was extended south to Farsta.

References

Green line (Stockholm metro) stations
Railway stations opened in 1950
1950 establishments in Sweden